Amelie Solja (born 29 September 1990) is an Austrian table tennis player, born in Kandel, Germany. She competed in women's team at the 2012 Summer Olympics in London.  Her sister Petrissa Solja was a silver medalist at the 2016 Olympic Games for Germany.

References

External links

1990 births
Living people
Sportspeople from Rhineland-Palatinate
Austrian female table tennis players
Olympic table tennis players of Austria
Table tennis players at the 2012 Summer Olympics
Table tennis players at the 2019 European Games
European Games competitors for Austria
People from Germersheim (district)
21st-century Austrian women